This was the first edition of the tournament.

Víctor Estrella Burgos won the title, defeating Feliciano López in the final, 6–2, 6–7(5–7), 7–6(7–5) .

Seeds
The top four seeds receive a bye into the second round. 

 Feliciano López (final)
 Santiago Giraldo (second round)
 Fernando Verdasco (semifinals)
 Martin Kližan (quarterfinals)
 Paolo Lorenzi (quarterfinals)
 Thomaz Bellucci (semifinals)
 Dušan Lajović (quarterfinals)
 Víctor Estrella Burgos (champion)

Draw

Finals

Top half

Bottom half

Qualifying

Seeds

 Thiemo de Bakker (first round)
 Jason Kubler (second round)
 Adrian Ungur (second round)
 Gerald Melzer (qualified)
 André Ghem (qualified)
 Roberto Carballés Baena (qualifying competition)
 Elias Ymer (first round)
 Fabiano de Paula (second round)

Qualifiers

Qualifying draw

First qualifier

Second qualifier

Third qualifier

Fourth qualifier

References
 Main Draw
 Qualifying Draw

2015 ATP World Tour
2015 Singles